Nasepia altae is a species of Ediacaran Erniettomorph which was described in 1973 from the farms of Vrede and Chamis, Namibia. Nasepia has an appearance similar to that of most other Erniettomorphs from Namibia, with it having a leaf-like body with thin ribs and spindle-shaped bodies, however it differentiates itself from other taxa such as Pteridinium and Rangea in the sense that it has smaller petaloids and with the configuration of the ribs being sub-parallel to its axis.

Description 
Nasepia altae represents an Erniettomorph with a morphology similar to that of a tiny leaf-like being, with it being made up of a bundle of spindle-shaped bodies, as well as fine ribs that are sub-parallel to a long axis that possess clearly marked margins on its sides. Germs (1973) also noted the appearance of transverse ribs on the body that only appear in some parts of Nasepia. The body fossils of it also share a similarity between  Pteridinium simplex and  Rangea schneiderhoehni with Nasepia also being made up of the same bundles of sprindle-shaped structures. Although, it contradictorily also differentiates from those two taxa because of its petaloids (structures which make up the signature leaf-like shape of Petalonamids) being much smaller than those seen in Pteridinium and Rangea.
 Nasepia is difficult to reconstruct as a living organism.

Occurrence 
Fossils of Nasepia occurred within the Nasep Quartzite Member that is within both the farms of Vrede and Chamis, Namibia and were found more specifically within the Kuibis and Schwarzrand subgroups enclosed by the Nama group.

See also 
 List of Ediacaran genera
 Erniettomorpha

References  

Ediacaran
Ediacaran life
Enigmatic prehistoric animal genera
Prehistoric animal genera
Fossil taxa described in 1973
Fossils of Namibia
Petalonamae